The Kennedy Highway is a highway in northern Queensland, Australia. It runs as National Route 1 for approximately 243 km from Smithfield, on the northern outskirts of Cairns, to the Gulf Developmental Road in the vicinity of Forty Mile Scrub and Undara Volcanic national parks (at Minnamoolka, about 40 kilometres south of Mount Garnet). South of this junction, the road continues as the Kennedy Developmental Road (State Highway 62) to Boulia about 936 kilometres away, via Hughenden.  West of the junction, National Route 1 continues as the Gulf Developmental Road to Normanton.

Route description

From Smithfield, the highway climbs up into the Atherton Tableland before heading in a general south-westerly direction to the aforementioned junction. The highway is mostly two-lanes. Major towns on, or just off, the Kennedy Highway include Smithfield, Kuranda, Mareeba, Atherton, Ravenshoe and Mount Garnet. Past Mount Garnet, the Kennedy Highway has several long sections of single lane bitumen. The section between The Lynd Roadhouse junction at Conjuboy and Hughenden is mostly unsealed and is also known as the Hann Highway.

Proof is currently lacking as to the cause, but it is believed likely that the anomaly was caused by an asteroid strike that happened about 300 million years ago.

Development proposal
Two northern councils (Etheridge and Flinders) have proposed development of the Hann Highway which would allow for the transport of products from Far North Queensland to markets in New South Wales and Victoria considerably quicker than via existing coastal routes which have rougher terrain and are sometimes impassable due to floods.

Northern Australia Roads Program upgrades
The Northern Australia Roads Program announced in 2016 included two projects for the Kennedy Developmental Road.

Road widening
The project for widening a section of road from a one-lane seal to a two-lane seal between Mount Garnet and The Lynd was completed in early 2018 at a total cost of $3.3 million.

Road upgrading
The project for upgrading sections of the road between The Lynd and Hughenden was completed in early 2020 at a total cost of $47.9 million.

Roads of Strategic Importance upgrades
The Roads of Strategic Importance initiative, last updated in March 2022, includes the following projects for the Kennedy Developmental Road.

Corridor upgrade
A lead project to upgrade the Queensland section of the Tennant Creek to Townsville corridor, including sections of the Barkly and Flinders Highways, the Kennedy Developmental Road and surrounding state and council roads, at an estimated cost of $250 million, was in the planning stage in 2020.

Progressive sealing
A project for progressive sealing of a section of the Kennedy Developmental Road between The Lynd and Hughenden at a cost of $50 million is planned to be completed by mid-2023. This project is targeted for "early works" by the Queensland Government.

Other upgrades

Strengthen and widen between Winton and Boulia

Bridge upgrade planning
A project to plan the upgrade of the Barron River bridge, at a cost of $2.1 million, was to be completed in late 2022.

Intelligent Transport System
A project to install Intelligent Transport System (ITS) treatments on Kuranda Range Road, at a cost of $30 million, was due to completed by late 2022.

Targeted road safety improvements
A project to provide targeted road safety improvements between Mareeba and Tolga, at a cost of $37.5 million, was due for completion in mid 2022.

Road safety enhancement works
A works program of six projects to provide road safety enhancements between Kuranda and Mareeba, at a cost of $45 million, was expected to complete in early 2023.

Major intersections

See also

 Highways in Australia
 List of highways in Queensland

References

Highways in Queensland
Far North Queensland
Highway 1 (Australia)
Central West Queensland